Remezov is a Russian masculine surname, its feminine counterpart is Remezova. It may refer to:

 Gennadi Remezov (born 1965), Russian professional footballer.
 Semyon Remezov (ca. 1642 – after 1720), Russian historian, architect and geographer of Siberia
Remezov Chronicle

Russian-language surnames